3-Bromothiophene is an organosulfur compound with the formula C4H3BrS.  It is a colorless liquid. It is a precursor to the antibiotic timentin and the vasodilator cetiedil.

Preparation
Unlike 2-bromothiophene, the 3-bromo isomer cannot be prepared directly from thiophene.  It can be prepared by debromination of 2,3,5-tribromothiophene, which is obtained by bromination of thiophene.

See also
 2-Bromothiophene

References

Thiophenes
Bromoarenes